Aircraft upset is a dangerous condition in aircraft operations in which the flight attitude or airspeed of an aircraft is outside the normal bounds of operation for which it is designed. This may result in the loss of control (LOC) of the aircraft, and sometimes the total loss of the aircraft itself. Loss of control may be due to excessive altitude for the airplane's weight, turbulent weather, pilot disorientation, or a system failure.

The U.S. NASA Aviation Safety Program defines upset prevention and upset recovery as to prevent loss-of-control accidents due to aircraft upset after inadvertently entering an extreme or abnormal flight attitude.

A Boeing-compiled list determined that 2,051 people died in 22 accidents in the years 1998–2007 due to LOC accidents. NTSB data for 1994–2003 count 32 accidents and more than 2,100 lives lost worldwide.

Overview

Loss of control as a factor in aviation accidents came into the spotlight with the 1994 crash of USAir Flight 427, which killed all 127 passengers and 5 crew members on board. In their report on the crash, the U.S. NTSB stated that prior to the crash they "had issued a series of safety recommendations over a 24-year period, asking the FAA to require air carriers to train pilots in recoveries from unusual flight attitudes. Throughout this period, the Safety Board was generally not satisfied with the FAA's responses to these recommendations; specifically, the Board disagreed with the FAA's responses that cited the inadequacy of flight simulators as a reason for not providing pilots with the requested training. However, after the USAir Flight 427 accident and the October 31, 1994, ATR-72 accident involving American Eagle Flight 4184 near Roselawn, Indiana, the FAA issued guidance to air carriers, acknowledging the value of flight simulator training in unusual attitude recoveries and encouraging air carriers to voluntarily provide this training to their pilots."

Some carriers did implement their own voluntary training programs, following those accidents, and the NTSB regarded those programs as "excellent".

In October 1996, the NTSB issued a formal Safety Recommendation (A-96-120), which requested the FAA to require all airlines to provide simulator training for flight crews, which would enable them to recognize and recover from "unusual attitudes and upset maneuvers, including upsets that occur while the aircraft is being controlled by automatic flight control systems, and unusual attitudes that result from flight control malfunctions and uncommanded flight control surface movements".

In 2004, the U.S. FAA issued its first Airplane Upset Recovery Training Aid. The second revision of that document was released in 2008 and is available at the FAA's website.

New FAA rules are expected to be finalized in 2010, requiring specific training for pilots to recover from aircraft upset incidents. New training programs may be known under the term advanced maneuver – upset recovery training (AM-URT).

In 2009, the Royal Aeronautical Society formed a new group of experts, who will form documentation to allow better simulations of aircraft upset conditions, and thus better training programs. Upset Prevention and Recovery Training (UPRT) provider, Aviation Performance Solutions, joined the Royal Aeronautical Society team in 2009 to help develop global solutions for overcoming Loss of Control In-Flight (LOC-I), the possible resulting flight condition following an airplane upset.

Detailed definition

From: The FAA's Pilot Guide to Airplane Upset Recovery.

An airplane upset is defined as an airplane in flight unintentionally exceeding the parameters normally experienced in line operations or training. In other words, the airplane is not doing what it was commanded to do and is approaching unsafe parameters. While specific values may vary among airplane models, the following unintentional conditions generally describe an airplane upset:

 Pitch attitude greater than 25°, nose up.
 Pitch attitude greater than 10°, nose down.
 Bank angle greater than 45°.
 Within the above parameters, but flying at airspeeds inappropriate for the conditions.

However, the definition of an upset is disputable and changes between documents and training programs. The Royal Aeronautics Society states: "An upset is not necessarily a departure from controlled flight (i.e. a stall/spin) but it also includes abnormal attitudes and gross over/under-speed conditions."
Calspan, which has been involved with upset research and training since teaming with NASA in 1997, holds that the generally accepted industry guidelines are incomplete in that they only take into consideration aircraft attitude and airspeed. Jet Upset is defined by Calspan as an airplane unintentionally exceeding the parameters normally experienced in line operations or a control failure or disturbance that alters the normal response of the airplane to pilot input such that the pilot must adopt an alternate control strategy to regain and sustain controlled flight. Normal flight parameters are defined as pitch attitude within:
 Pitch attitude between 25° nose-up and 10° nose-down.
 Bank angle less than 45°.
 Airspeed versus maneuver loading within the normal flight envelope.

This expanded definition is intended to more fully capture the maneuvers, events, conditions, and circumstances that the record has shown lead to LOC.

Jet upset

The phrase jet upset refers to accidents and incidents (some crashed and some recovered, usually with significant damage to the structure), where a jet airliner was "upset" and ended up in a high-speed dive. That phenomenon was almost unknown in the days of piston-driven propeller airliners, which is why those accidents were referenced as "jet" upsets: because it was a repeated phenomenon that was unique to jet airliners, with swept-back wings, jet engines and movable horizontal stabilizers, none of which were found on the piston/propeller airliners. With the phasing out of piston-driven propeller airliners, that phrase has gradually given way to "loss of control-inflight", which includes, but is not limited to, the upset/high-speed dive type of accidents. The term jet upset was most heavily used in the 1960s and 1970s as the phenomenon was not well understood and was still being researched. Contemporary authors tend to group the phenomenon under loss of control.

There have been a variety of causes and contributing factors, in past jet upset accidents:

 February 1959: Pan Am Flight 115, a Pan American World Airways Boeing 707, upset and went into a high-speed dive while cruising over the Atlantic at flight level 350. Control was not recovered until reaching 6,000 ft. After landing safely at Gander, extensive structural damage was found, but there were only a few minor injuries. The Captain was in the cabin when the autopilot disconnected without adequate warning to the First Officer, who was distracted with a "howgozit" report form. It wasn't until the first officer felt the stall buffet that he realized they were descending rapidly and about to turn upside down. He was unable to level the wings. Fortunately, the Captain was able to return to the cockpit and strap into his seat while enduring significant G-forces. He took over the controls, leveled the wings and pulled out of the dive.
 February 1963: Northwest Airlines Flight 705 – A Northwest Airlines Boeing 720B was hit with a powerful updraft (it suddenly began climbing at 9,000 ft. per minute) while climbing through 17,000 ft as it tried to fly between thunderstorms shortly after takeoff. The nose pitched up so high that the pilot reacted by using full nose-down trim on the horizontal stabilizer (HS), while simultaneously pushing the elevators to the full down position. Then, an equally powerful down draft hit the plane and it went straight down in a matter of seconds. The pilot then pulled back on the yoke, moving the elevators to the full up position. This imposed high G-load on the plane, resulting in binding of the horizontal stabilizer jackscrew, such that it remained in a full trimmed down position. The plane came apart in the air, before hitting the ground.
 July 1963: United Airlines Flight 746 Boeing 720-022 (C/N 18045, Registration N7213U), while climbing through FL 370 near O'Neill, Nebraska, was upset and resulted in a high-speed dive until recovery at 14,000 ft. The plane encountered severe turbulence, downdrafts and updrafts, which caused the plane to stall. The plane was approaching the coffin corner of its flight envelope, when the turbulence was encountered. After that near disaster, the stall mach buffet margins were widened on all jet aircraft, to preclude a plane getting into that situation again, where severe turbulence narrows the "coffin corner" margins so severely that the pilots do not have time to avoid a high altitude stall.
 November 1963: Trans-Canada Air Lines Flight 831 – All 118 on board a Trans-Canada Airlines DC-8-54F were killed, when the plane crashed 5 minutes after takeoff near Montreal, leaving a crater in the ground. Impact speed was over 500 mph. Investigators found the pitch trim compensator actuator was in the extended position and the horizontal stabilizer trim setting was at 1.65 to 2 degrees nosedown (both were improper positions, for that stage of flight). "The probable cause of this accident could not be determined with certainty. Certain possible causes which were put forward could not be ruled out: 1) Icing of the Pitot system; 2) Failure of the vertical gyro; 3) An unprogrammed and unnoticed extension of the pitch trim compensator."
 February 1964: Eastern Air Lines Flight 304 – An Eastern Airlines DC-8 crashed into Lake Pontchartrain about 5 minutes after taking off from the New Orleans Moisant Airport. All 58 on board perished. The water was only 20 ft. deep, yet only 60% of the wreckage was recovered, because the breakup was so extensive. The flight data recorder tape was too damaged to help the analysis. Instead, they used the maintenance records of that plane, and of other DC-8s, to conclude that the pilots had trimmed the stabilizer to the full nose-down position, to counter the excessive nose-up attitude that, in turn, was caused by a malfunctioning pitch trim compensator that had extended too far. Once the upset occurred, it was not possible to trim the HS back to the nose-up position, because of the severe G-forces generated by their pulling back on the yoke after the upset.
February 1985: China Airlines Flight 006: The number 4 engine flamed out on a China Airlines Boeing 747SP, while cruising at FL 410 over the Pacific Ocean. The captain ordered an attempt to restart the engine, while remaining at flight level 410 and with the autopilot controlling the plane. He failed to use left rudder to counteract the asymmetrical thrust, and the plane rolled rapidly to the right and entered a high dive attitude. He was unable to recover from the dive until below 11,000 ft. when they emerged from the clouds. The plane exceeded the maximum operating airspeed (Vmo) twice, during the dive. After recovery, the plane landed safely at San Francisco. It suffered major structural damage and 2 occupants received serious injuries.

Related accidents

 3 March 1974 Turkish Airlines Flight 981 (cargo door failure, caused severing of essential flight control cables).
 4 April 1979 TWA Flight 841 (1979) (Improper manipulation of flaps/slats by pilots; the plane high dived from 39,000 ft. to 5,000 ft, in 63 seconds. Landed safely.)
 12 August 1985 Japan Airlines Flight 123 (Improper repair caused bulkhead explosion, which severed all hydraulic flight control lines)
 19 July 1989 United Airlines Flight 232 (Catastrophic engine failure caused loss of all 3 hydraulic flight control lines)
 30 June 1994 1994 Airbus Industrie Flight 129 (Control was lost after the pilot shut down one engine, close to the ground, during a certification test flight)
 8 September 1994 USAir Flight 427 (Control lost when the rudder PCU malfunctioned, causing the rudder to move in the opposite direction, commanded by the pilot)
 7 April 1994 Federal Express Flight 705 (During an attempted hijacking by employee Auburn Calloway, the crew of the DC-10-30F carried out numerous aerobatic techniques to disorient the attacker, pushing the aircraft to its limits.
 31 October 1994 American Eagle Flight 4184 While in a holding pattern, extensive ice accumulation produced a sudden reversal of the aileron controls, causing the plane to upset and dive into the ground.
 11 December 1994 Philippine Airlines Flight 434 (Terrorist Bombing leading to loss of flight control, landed safely)
 12 November 2001 American Airlines Flight 587
 22 November 2003 DHL Baghdad incident
 6 March 2005 Air Transat Flight 961
 1 January 2007 Adam Air Flight 574
 12 February 2009 Colgan Air Flight 3407 (stall during landing approach, killing all on board)
 1 June 2009 Air France Flight 447 (Entered high altitude stall, impacted ocean)
 28 December 2014 Indonesia AirAsia Flight 8501
 9 January 2021 Sriwijaya Air Flight 182 (Autothrottle failure leading to pilot error and subsequent upset, impacted ocean)

See also

 Boeing 737 rudder issues
 Inertia coupling
 List of aircraft upset factors
 Upset Prevention and Recovery Training

References

Further reading
 Dismukes, Key, Benjamin A. Berman and Loukia D. Loukopoulos. The Limits of Expertise. Aldershot: Ashgate, 2007.

External links
 U.S. FAA Airplane Upset Recovery Training Aid, Revision 2, 443 pages, 25.8 MB
 Boeing Company Aerodynamic Principles of Large-Airplane Upsets
 NASA Airplane Upset Training Evaluation Report, May 2002
 APS Europe
 

Aviation risks